Eglon (also Hungry Hook or Maple Run) is an unincorporated community in Preston County, West Virginia, United States.  Its elevation is 2,628 feet (801 m).  It has a post office with the ZIP code 26716.

The community was named after the biblical city of Eglon.

References

Unincorporated communities in Preston County, West Virginia
Unincorporated communities in West Virginia